In narratology, fabula equates to the thematic content of a narrative and syuzhet equates to the chronological structure of the events within the narrative. Vladimir Propp and Viktor Shklovsky originated the terminology  as part of the Russian Formalism movement in the early 20th century. Narratologists have described  fabula as "the raw material of a story", and syuzhet as "the way a story is organized". 

Since Aristotle's Poetics, narrative plots have been described as having a beginning, middle, and end. Classical narratives tend to have synchronous fabula and syuzhet, but they may be treated in an asynchronous manner according to a modern or postmodern style. An asynchronous effect is often achieved in postructuralist film and novels via flashbacks or flashforwards. For example, the film Citizen Kane starts with the death of the main character, and then tells his life through flashbacks interspersed with a journalist's present-time investigation of Kane's life. The fabula of the film is the actual story of Kane's life the way it happened in chronological order, while the syuzhet is the way the story is told throughout the movie, including flashbacks.

Critical reviews

Poststructuralism
Jonathan Culler in The Pursuit of Signs: Semiotics, Literature, Deconstruction (1981) notes a certain contradiction in assigning priority to either fabula or syuzhet (170-172). The operative assumption amongst many literary critics is that fabula precedes the syuzhet, which provides one of many ways of rendering what took place in the story. Culler argues that one can also understand fabula as a production of the syuzhet, whereby certain events are created and ordered at the level of story in order to produce a meaningful narrative. Critics, he argues, subscribe to a view in which fabula precedes syuzhet when debating the significance of a character's actions, but adopt the opposite view when they discuss the "appropriateness" of a narrative's ending (178). 

Jacques Derrida (1979) is also critical of the logocentric hierarchic ordering of syuzhet and fabula. He raises the question, "What if there are story ways of telling as well as narrative ways of telling? And if so, how is it that narrative in the American-European tradition has become privileged over story?" One answer is that narrative is both syuzhet (emplotment) and a subjection of fabula (the stuff of story, represented through narrative). For example, Derrida views narrative as having a terrible secret, in its way of oppressing story:

The question-of-narrative covers, with a certain modesty, a demand for narrative, a violent putting-to-the-question, an instrument of torture working to wring out the narrative as if it were a terrible secret, in ways that can go from the most archaic police methods to refinements for making (and even letting) one talk unsurpassed in neutrality and politeness, most respectfully medical, psychiatric, and even psychoanalytic. (Derrida, 1979: 94).

If story is more than fabula, dominated by narrative, it could have its own manner of discourse, rather than being subordinate to narrative. Derrida plays with just such an idea as follows in setting story in relation to its homonym:

Each "story" (and each occurrence of the word "story", each "story" in the story) is part of the other, makes the other part (of itself), each "story" is at once larger and smaller than itself, includes itself without including (or comprehending) itself, identifies itself with itself even as it remains utterly different from its homonym. (Derrida, 1979: 99-100).

Symbolic interactionism
Jerome Bruner also raises issues about fabula and syuzhet. He summarizes syuzhet as the plot of narrative, and fabula as a timeless underlying theme (Bruner, 1986, pp. 7, 17-21). Bruner wants fabula to be a little more "loose fitting a constraint" on story: "I think we would do well with as loose fitting a constraint as we can manage concerning what a story must 'be' to be a story" (p. 17).

The problem for Bruner is to explore the underlying narrative structures (syuzhets) in not only Russian formalism, but also French Structuralism (Roland Barthes, Tzvetan Todorov and others). The European formalists posit narrative grammars (i.e., Todorov's simple transformations of mode, intention, result, manner, aspect and status, as well as complex transformations of appearance, knowledge, supposition, description, subjectification and attitude). For Bruner, the story (fabula stuff) becomes the "virtual text" (p. 32) to the narrative grammars. "Nevertheless, Shotter suggests that Bruner failed to engage these 'particularities of otherness' in favour of abstractive explanation of meaning-making processes rather than in a description of dialogical performances" (Mos, 2003: 2). In other words, there is a need to consider how narrative pursues grammars and abstract meaning frames, whereas story can be dialogic and in the web of the social.

Language studies
Mikhail Bakhtin is also not convinced that fabula and syuzhet is a complete explanation of the relationship of narrative and story. Like Derrida, he is suspicious of the hegemony of narrative over story.

For Bakhtin (1973: 12) "narrative genres are always enclosed in a solid and unshakable monological framework." Story, for Bakhtin, is decidedly more dialogue-based, for example in the "polyphonic manner of the story" (Bakhtin, 1973: 60).

Benjamin Whorf (1956: 256), following up an observation by Franz Boas, contended that the Hopi Indians do not experience themselves, or life, as narrative grammar or pattern. Rather than past-present-future, as segregated syuzhet, the Hopi experience is one of "eventing." Shotter (1993: 109) refers to Whorf's "eventing" and to the Hopi's differences with Euro-American space and time.

See also
 Nonlinear narrative
 Organizational storytelling
 Story arc
 Storytelling
 Plot (narrative)
 Narratology
 Chronotope, Bakhtin's concept of how configurations of time and space are represented in language and discourse
 Memento, a film that plays heavily with the distinction between fabula and syuzhet

References

Sources
 Aristotle. Poetics.
 Bakhtin, M. (1973). Problems of Dostoevsky's Poetics (C. Emerson, ed. and trans.). Manchester, England: Manchester University Press.
 Bakhtin, M. (1981). The Dialogic Imagination: Four Essays by M.M. Bakhtin (ed. Holquist, M.). Austin: University of Texas Press.
 Benjamin, W. (1969). The Storyteller: Observations on the Works of Nikolai Leskov, in Illuminations (Ed. Hannah Arendt, trans. Harry Zohn). New York: Schoken Books.
 Boje, D. M. (2001). Narrative Methods for Organizational and Communication Research. London: Sage.
 Bruner, Jerome. (1986). Actual Minds, Possible Worlds. Cambridge, MASS.: Harvard University Press.
 Cox, James. (2006). Muting White Noise: The Subversion of Popular Culture Narratives of Conquest in Sherman Alexie's Fiction. University of Oklahoma Press.
 Culler, Jonathan. (1981). The Pursuit of Signs: Semiotics, Literature, Deconstruction. Ithaca, NY: Cornell University Press.
 Derrida, Jacques. (1979). ‘Living On – Border Lines’ in Deconstruction and Criticism (NY: Seabury Press, edited by Harold Bloom et al., 1979).
 King, Thomas. (2003). The Truth about Stories: A Native Narrative. Toronto: House of Ananasi.
 Mos, Leendert. (2003). Jerome Bruner: Language, Culture, Self. Canadian Psychology (Feb), on line review of David Bakhurst & Sturart Shanker (Eds.( Jerome Bruner: Language, Culture, Self. London: Sage Publications, 2001. Accessed at Bruner
 Propp, Vladimir. (1928/1968). Morphology of the Folk Tale. English trans. Laurence Scott. TX: University of Texas Press (first published in Moscow in 1928; English, 1968).
 Shklovsky, Viktor. (1917/1965). Art as Technique in L T Lemon and M Reis, eds., (1965) Russian Formalist Criticism. University of Nebraska Press.
 Shotter, John (1993). Conversational Realities. London: Sage.
 Silko, Leslie Marmon. (1981). Storyteller. NY: Arcade Publishing
 Whorf, Benjamin Lee (1956). Language, Thought and Reality - Selected Writings.

Further reading
 Garcia-Landa, Jose Angel. 1990. Narrative Theory (University of Zaragoza); On line edition 2005, Russian Formalism 
 Pateman, Trevor. 1991. English Formalism and Russian Formalism: Clive Bell and Viktor Shklovsky English Formalism
 Walsh, Richard, 2001. Fabula and Fictionality in Narrative Theory. Style. Narrative Theory

Narratology
Russian formalism
Semiotics